"Don't Have a Cow" is the second episode and Halloween special in the second season of the Disney Channel television series That's So Raven, which aired on October 17, 2003. It was written by Michael Carrington and directed by Rich Correll.

In the episode, Raven and Chelsea attempt to use magic to attend the Halloween party of Raven's nemesis, Alana. While the plan works, a mistake in their spell-casting causes them to start turning into cows. In the subplot, Cory tries to convince Victor that he's too old to be trick-or-treating with him.

Plot
Raven and Chelsea are the only students in their class not invited to Alana's Halloween party due to Raven's bad history with her. At the Chill Grill, Victor tells them that Alana's having the party at the restaurant, which Raven knows Alana did to spite her. Chelsea panics after realizing Victor accidentally switched their orders, resulting in her eating a hamburger instead of a veggie burger. Being a vegetarian, she feels guilty and begins wearing a pin button with a cow's face on it.

After finishing his shift, Victor, dressed up as Victor Frankenstein, prepares to go trick-or-treating with Cory, who's wearing a body builder costume. Cory tells Victor that he wants to trick-or-treat with his friends rather than his father. The disappointed Victor allows Cory to go with his friend William, whose costume is a remote control that causes nearby electrical products to malfunction. Tanya, dressed as Igor, cheers Victor up by offering to trick-or-treat with him in Cory's place.

Raven and Chelsea pass the time by looking inside a trunk filled with paranormal objects that belong to Raven's grandmother, Viv. They come across a magical book that contains instructions for a spell that can grant any wish and decide to try casting it to get invited to Alana's party. After placing the necessary ingredients in a cauldron and reciting the magic words, they receive a call from a hypnotized Alana confirming their invitations. The two then wish to become the most popular girls at the party and have the best costumes. They fail to notice Chelsea's button fall into the cauldron during their second incantation and go upstairs to prepare their costumes.

While looking for outfits, they are horrified to find that they each have developed cow ears and tails. Eddie comes to the house to take them to the party, but they force him to leave as they start mooing sporadically and allow him to take the spell book to go with his sorcerer costume. The two discover that they are turning into cows due to the button's interference with the spell and are unable reverse the magic without the book. Raven suggests that they go to the party and get the book back to undo the spell, believing that the students won't question their appearances on Halloween.

Cory and William return to the house empty-handed due to William's costume setting off multiple alarms in the neighborhood. Victor and Tanya arrive back with a bag full of candy and allow the boys to take some of theirs. Cory tells Victor that he misses trick-or-treating with him, prompting Victor to take the two boys out to get more candy.

At the party, Raven and Chelsea struggle to find Eddie as their bodies and behavior continue to become more cowlike. When they finally locate him, Chelsea eats the book page they needed to reverse the spell just as Alana's friends halt the party to announce the costume contest results. Alana is outraged to learn that she placed second behind Raven and Chelsea. The students applaud Raven and Chelsea, who have now fully transformed into Holstein cows. The two sarcastically remark that their wish came true and that they "might as well milk it". It is revealed that the whole night was all a vision that Raven had right before Chelsea ate the burger, allowing her to stop Chelsea from eating meat and prevent her vision from happening.

Back at the house, Victor and Tanya spend their alone time eating their Halloween candy.

Reception
Even a decade after its release, "Don't Have a Cow" is considered a Halloween classic, with a number of publications praising the main plot revolving around Raven and Chelsea's cow transformations. MTV named it #1 in their "9 most iconic Disney Channel Halloween episodes" and called it one of the scariest Disney Channel Halloween experiences, stating "When the spin-off series debuts, I seriously hope they remake this episode, because what's more traumatizing than becoming a cow? NOTHING." Glamour listed it in their "9 Disney Channel Halloween Episodes to Watch," saying, "All you need to know about the Halloween episode of That's So Raven is that it ends with Raven and Chelsea turning into real-life cows. Like, they grow snouts, moo excessively, and chew cud. If that doesn't explain the high school experience, then what does?"

References

External links

2003 American television episodes
That's So Raven
Halloween television episodes
Cattle in popular culture
Television episodes about even-toed ungulates
Television episodes about livestock